Mariya Koroleva (born April 10, 1990) is a Russian-born American synchronized swimmer. After emigrating to the United States, Koroleva began participating in synchronized swimming, and competed at Stanford University. She was a member of the teams that won silver medals in the duet and team competitions at the 2011 Pan American Games in Guadalajara, Mexico. She competed at the 2012 and 2016 Summer Olympics.

Biography
Koroleva was born on April 10, 1990, in Yaroslavl, Russian SFSR, Soviet Union, to Svetlana and Nikolay Korolev, and later emigrated with her family to the United States, settling in Concord, California. There, she began to compete in national youth competitions in synchronized swimming.

After being accepted to Stanford University, she experienced considerable success in collegiate and national competitions. In the 2009 collegiate championships, she finished second in team and figures, third in trio, and fifth in duet. That same year at the national championships she came in third in team and fourth in duet. During the following year's collegiate championships, she finished second place in the trio competition and third in the duet.

Shortly before the 2011 Pan American Games in Guadalajara, Mexico, she was partnered with Mary Killman to compete as a duet. At those games, Killman and Koroleva won a silver medal in the duet competition, and were members of the United States team that won a silver in the team competition as well. The pair qualified for the women's duet at the 2012 Summer Olympics in London, and due to the failure of the United States to qualify for the team event, they were the only American women to compete in synchronized swimming at those games.

Koroleva was one of three University of San Francisco students to compete in the 2016 Summer Olympics, joined by Israeli long-distance runner Maor Tiyouri and Venezuelan basketball player John Cox.  At the 2016 Summer Olympics, she teamed with Anita Alvarez in the women's duet, finishing in 9th place.

References

1990 births
Living people
Synchronized swimmers at the 2012 Summer Olympics
Synchronized swimmers at the 2016 Summer Olympics
Olympic synchronized swimmers of the United States
Synchronized swimmers at the 2011 Pan American Games
American synchronized swimmers
Russian emigrants to the United States
Stanford Cardinal athletes
Sportspeople from Yaroslavl
People from Concord, California
Sportspeople from California
Synchronized swimmers at the 2015 Pan American Games
Pan American Games silver medalists for the United States
Pan American Games bronze medalists for the United States
Pan American Games medalists in synchronized swimming
Universiade medalists in synchronized swimming
Universiade bronze medalists for the United States
University of San Francisco alumni
Sportspeople from Walnut Creek, California
Medalists at the 2013 Summer Universiade
Medalists at the 2011 Pan American Games
Medalists at the 2015 Pan American Games